Justė Juozapaitytė (born 19 April 1990) is a Lithuanian model, beauty pageant contestant and entrepreneur.

Beauty pageants
In 2007 Juozapaityte participated in the LNK reality show Grožio mokykla (Beauty School) where she reached the final and qualified for the Miss Lithuania 2007 contest. In the Miss Lithuania contest Juozapaityte won the Miss Lithuania photogenic 2007 title. In the same year Juozapaityte won the Miss Fashion TV 2007 crown. By winning this crown she became the face of the channel for one year.

Top Model

Britain & Ireland's Next Top Model
In 2011, Juozapaityte participated in Britain & Ireland's Next Top Model, Cycle 7. In episode 7, Juozapaityte won a catwalk challenge, and gained a first call out in episodes 11, and 12. She found great favour with clients, and judges, but lost out in episode 13, when Jade Thompson was declared the winner.

Russia's Next Top Model
During season five of the Russian adaptation of Top Model, Top Model po-russki (rus. Топ-модель по-русски), Juozapaityte became one of the 20 semi-finalists to make it onto the show. There she was admitted into the finalized cast of fourteen contestants. As in Britain & Ireland's Next Top Model, Juozapaityte once again made it to the final two. She was placed as the runner-up once again.

Career

Early modelling work
Juozapaityte started her modelling career in 2007 after Miss Lithuania 2007 contest. Few weeks after the pageant she went to work in Milan for a summer. Her first contract was with Lithuanian modelling agency Modilinos.She worked in Thailand, China, Vietnam and Hong Kong. She appeared in commercials for Nike and Lynx. Since Britain's & Ireland's Next Top Model, Juozapaityte has taken more test shots, and continues to update fans concerning her career. She also appeared in the video for the single "Starlight" by English singer-songwriter Matt Cardle. Juozapaityte was on the cover of November 2011 Choque cover. In December 2011, Juozapaityte modeled for new Amy Hall collection.

Business
Juozapaityte founded her mineral water business Alitasa in 2013 back in Lithuania. She took a leading role in the development and management of the company, serving as chief executive officer as well as Creative Director.  In 2017, Juozapaityte expanded into Spain and UK and added new products to the line.

References

External links
 
 

Living people
1990 births
Lithuanian beauty pageant winners
Lithuanian female models
Lithuanian expatriates in England
Top Model finalists
People from Palanga
Britain & Ireland's Next Top Model contestants